Transformers is a comic book series by IDW Publishing, spun off from the Transformers film series.

The Transformers (2007) series

Transformers: Movie Prequel

Transformers: Movie Prequel is a 2007 limited series that serves as a prequel to the 2007 film Transformers. It is written by Simon Furman and IDW editor-in-chief Chris Ryall, who was allowed to read the film's script, and penciled by artist Don Figueroa. Transformers: Movie Adaptation, a 4 issue adaptation of the film itself, was released weekly throughout the month of June in the run up to the film's release.

Plot summary
Optimus Prime and Lord High Protector Megatron rule Cybertron, protecting the Allspark, an enormous cube of energy that gave life to the Transformers. However, Megatron secretly desires the Allspark's power for himself and has formed a like-minded army of separatists - the Decepticons - with Starscream at his side. He then plunges Cybertron into civil war, killing millions. During the Battle of Tyger Pax, Autobot Bumblebee leads a team to hold back overwhelming odds of Dreadwing, Payload and Swindle Drones while Prime attempts to launch the Allspark into space, making a last-ditch attempt to prevent Megatron from claiming it. The Decepticons capture Bumblebee and torture him. Bumblebee keeps Megatron distracted long enough for the Allspark to be launched into space. A determined Megatron flies into space to find it, but not before punishing Bumblebee by crushing his voice processor. After finding a way to tell Prime and the other Autobots of Megatron's plan, Bumblebee is among the first to volunteer to find it before he does.

Megatron, keeping a close psychic bond with the Allspark, soon locates it on Earth. Heating up during entry into the atmosphere, he crashes and sinks under the Arctic ice sheets. The sudden temperature drop and loss of energon forces him into stasis lock. In 1897, the National Arctic Circle Expedition headed by Captain Archibald Witwicky discovers Megatron frozen solid, and accidentally reactivates the Decepticon's navigational system. The location of the Allspark is burned into Captain Witwicky's glasses, blinding him and eventually driving him insane.  At the Boston Secure Hospital, the government takes great interest in his story and the Sector 7 group begins excavating for Megatron, codenamed the "Ice-man". In 1902, the Allspark is discovered to be in the Colorado River, and by 1935, work begins on the Hoover Dam over it with plans to move Megatron there.

In 2003, Bumblebee lands on Mars before landing in Virginia, and takes up the form of a 1976 Chevrolet Camaro. Designated N.B.E - 2, he avoids Sector 7's gaze, forcing Agent Simmons to step up an operation to capture him. Bumblebee begins finding information on Captain Witwicky, and Sector 7 attempts to spring a trap with a replica Allspark. Starscream, Blackout and Barricade follow suit, destroying the Beagle 2 Mars rover in the process. They scan and destroy vehicles and defeat Sector 7's trap. They let Bumblebee escape as they know he can lead them to the Allspark. Elsewhere, Sam Witwicky is given his ancestor's glasses. A Target Corporation-exclusive follow-up shows Bumblebee tracking down Sam by checking outside Archibald's asylum and looking for his son, Clarence, to Springfield, Missouri, where he learns of his son Herbert, his six children and starts to look for each, one-by-one. All the while he is being followed by Sector 7 and Barricade.

Publication

The first issue was due for release in February 2007, but was moved back to March 6 due to a printing error. It was part of Free Comic Book Day on May 5, 2007. A trade paperback is scheduled for release on June 25, with an adaptation of the movie itself released the same day.

Issues 1 and 2 are sold out. Issue 3 contains a number of cameo homages to Generation 1 Transformer vehicle modes; dotted throughout the issue are vehicles which resemble the original Optimus Prime, Trailbreaker, Ironhide, Motormaster and Bumblebee, as well as Scourge from the Robots in Disguise series. Issue 3 also parodies Google with a search engine called "Shwiggle". This is apparently an in-joke name for colorist Josh Burcham. An IDW Comics webpage is also shown. Furthermore, the last few panels of issue 3 reveal the events of what we see in the announcement trailer from the perspective of those responsible; it is revealed that the Mars rover had been destroyed specifically by Starscream, however in other versions it was revealed that it was Bumblebee.

Animated adaptation
For the release of the Transformers DVD, the Wal-Mart edition of the DVD included an animated version of the prequel comic book, entitled Transformers: Beginnings. Beginnings followed the comics almost page for page, with a few exceptions of removed content—for instance it removed all non-movie Transformers such as Arcee and Swindle. Arcee still appears in a non speaking role.

Voice Cast:
 Peter Cullen as Optimus Prime
 Frank Welker as Megatron
 Mark Ryan as Bumblebee
 Patrick Hallahan as Starscream / Additional Voices
 Brian Stepanek as Blackout / Agent Reggie Simmons
 Kevin Dunn as Ron Witwicky
 Patrick Viall as Captain Archibald Witwicky / Additional Voices
 Harold Hayes, Jr. as Bald Sector 7 Agent
 Justin Foley as Additional Voices 
 Kenny Luper as Additional Voices
 Ryan Pfeiffer as Additional Voices
Unknown voice actors voice Sam, Barricade and Epps

Transformers: Movie Prequel Special
Transformers: Movie Prequel Special is a reprinting of two previous movie prequel comics that had been produced in cooperation with Target Corporation. It was released on June 18, 2008. It includes:
 Interlude
 Planetfall

Transformers: Movie Adaptation

Transformers: Movie Adaptation, is a 2007 limited series that serves as an adaptation of the 2007 film Transformers. After the close of the prequel comic series, IDW also published a 4-issue adaptation of the film itself to tie-in with the film's release, written by Kris Oprisko and drawn by Alex Milne. It was released weekly in June 2007; on the 6th, 13th, 20th and 27th. It also featured concept art and interviews.

Although telling the same basic story, there are some differences with the plot of the comic and film. Besides removing many minor scenes, some complete changes were made:
 At the beginning of issue #1, Captain Witwicky, instead of accidentally activating Megatron's navigation system by touching one of Megatron's digit gears, uses a pick axe to break off the ice covering the frozen Megatron's face, thus suggesting Megatron intentionally imprinted a map to the All Spark on Witwicky's glasses, anticipating one of the Decepticons would find it soon enough.
 In issue #1 Bumblebee doesn't trash the other cars at the used car lot.
 Also in Issue 1, Sam is never seen going to school to give his family genealogy report on his great-great grandfather.
 In issue #2 Sam's parents have a greatly reduced role. Mojo only appears barking in one panel. Sam's username is "HodStud217" as opposed to "LadiesMan217". Mikaela cuts off Frenzy's head with a circular saw, not a reciprocating saw. Frenzy reformats himself as Mikela's PDA, not a cell phone. Bumblebee reformats himself into a newer Camaro by scanning files for its design over the internet, not by scanning another car.
 Issue #2 includes the scene deleted from the film where Sam and Ron are leaving the Police Station and Sam discusses his great-great grandfather's insanity with Ron and wonders if it may have passed down to him [Sam].
 In issue #3 Mikaela comes up with the name "Autobot". Jazz runs into the power lines by Sam's house, not Ratchet. There are no jokes about masturbation or urination. There is no mention of Mikaela's criminal record. Simmons isn't forced to strip. Maggie only appears in the helicopter ride to Hoover Dam and speaks once, then is not seen after arriving at the Sector 7 headquarters. The character of Glenn does not appear, even though he can be seen in cover of the Issue #1.
 In issue #4 Maggie's cell phone is brought to life, not Glenn's [as he did not appear in the comic]. Frenzy's body is not regenerated by the Allspark Cube; he asks the Decepticons to bring the body so he can re-attach it. He never gets it back and does not appear afterwards.
 With the exception of Optimus Prime, and only a few short lines from Jazz and Ratchet, none of the Autobots spoke.
 The animated cell phone is destroyed by a sabot round from a pistol, not an electrical blast. Optimus Prime kills Bonecrusher with a shot to the chest from a retractable gun in his hand, not a retractable blade. He then kills Barricade by throwing him into an overpass column.
 Other than the cell phone in Hoover Dam, no other objects are brought to life with the Allspark energy, unlike the film in which a Steering Wheel, Xbox 360 and a Mountain Dew dispenser come alive. Megatron rips Jazz's spark out, not ripping him in two to kill him. Megatron's right arm turns into a cannon on the roof top, not a flail. Optimus Prime urges Sam to kill Megatron with the Allspark, mainly because the opportunity to push the cube into Prime's spark was not open as it was blocked by Megatron's claw, contrary to the film, which Optimus urges Sam to not kill him. After the Decepticon remains are dumped in the Laurentian Abyss, a nuclear device is used to destroy them.
 Starscream was not seen escaping into space.
 Megatron was unfrozen due to the Decepticons' attack, not because of Frenzy.

The movie adaptation featured several intentional Easter eggs. These include the posters on Sam's bedroom wall - one of which reads TFW2005 (a reference to the Transformers collectors web page ) and another for G.I. Joe (another 1980s Hasbro line which has crossed over with Transformers on numerous occasions.) A box decorated with a G.I. Joe logo is seen in a pawn shop. A small Kremzeek model appears in Sam's bedroom. Sam bikes past an "IDW Comics" shop. Among the cars who appeared in the background were ones identical in make and color to Generation 1 Optimus Prime, Ironhide, Sideswipe, Trailbreaker, Wheeljack and Brawn, as well as Skids from the Transformers: Alternators toy line. Barricade stands in front of a car whose license plate is ALXMLN, a reference to artist Alex Milne.

Transformers: The Reign of Starscream

Transformers: The Reign of Starscream is a sequel to their adaptation of the 2007 live action Transformers film. The first issue was released in May 2008.

Plot summary
The first issue follows the story of the film from Starscream's perspective, with him organizing his team to follow Megatron to Earth. During the battle in Mission City, Starscream is enraged by Megatron's uncaring attitude towards the death of his comrades. Following his leader's death, Starscream meets with a wounded Barricade (whom Ironhide caused to crash into a barrier and thus miss the battle) and is told the dead Frenzy had important files on Sam Witwicky and the All Spark. Starscream tells Barricade to carry on his role as his spy on Earth, while he flies to the Hoover Dam to recover Frenzy.

In the second issue, Starscream retrieves Frenzy but is injured, and he is forced to return to Mars in F-22 Raptor form. He explains to Thundercracker he likes his Earth form though, admitting he admires the humans for killing Megatron and destroying the All Spark. The two Seekers decide to return to Cybertron, using Frenzy's data to recreate the All Spark. They begin transmitting the data to Cybertron, and prepare to enter a Space Bridge. Starscream is confident with Optimus Prime on Earth, no one can stop his conquest of their home planet, unaware an Autobot team (consisting of Arcee, Cliffjumper, Air Raid, Camshaft, Smokescreen and Cosmos) are about to attack.

The third issue opens with the Autobots being engaged by a swarm of drones. They easily rip through them, even killing Hardtop, but are put on the defensive as Thundercracker arrives, killing several of them. Arcee, furious at history repeating itself as her colleagues fall, manages to badly wound him, but it is too late: a recharged Starscream arrives and kills all but her. The Decepticons return to Cybertron, with Ramjet having prepared things for his new lord. The data transmitted has been used, and a new All Spark is now under construction, with Autobot slave labour doing the bulk of the work.

Starscream becomes more and more obsessed with not repeating the mistakes of Megatron and Prime and broods over Sector Seven Data showing Wreckage to be alive and working with them. Arcee arrives on Cybertron, having stowed away on the Decepticon ship, and falls in with the Autobot resistance led by Crosshairs and Clocker, who are considering a suicide strike to destroy the new Allspark and rescue the other Autobots. Starscream plans to use the Sparks of his Autobot captives (and an unfortunate Crankcase) to power up the new Cube. However, it inexplicably fails as Dreadwing betrays Starscream in an attempt to claim its power. A three-way battle breaks out between Dreadwing's drones, Starscream's forces and the Autobots. Dreadwing attempts to escape in a ship, travelling through the Space Bridge to Mars - unaware Starscream has followed him. The Decepticon leader rips out the traitor's Spark and vows to regain control as he gazes at Earth.

Links with other stories
The series is consistent with Target Corporation's second prequel comic to the film with Wreckage being killed by humans upon arriving on Earth. However, the third issue refers to the torture of Bumblebee's squad (including Arcee) by Megatron, an event which took place in the first issue of the original prequel series, which seemingly takes place in a different continuity. The Transformers use spaceships, the absence of which in the film is explained by the Decepticons parking theirs (the Nemesis) on Mars before flying as protoforms to Earth.

Starscream's story is directly followed up on in Transformers: Alliance, the first comic prequel to Transformers: Revenge of the Fallen, as is the Wreckage subplot from this story.

Publication
When announced at the 2007 Comic-Con International, the series was entitled The Search for Starscream. Chris Mowry explained readers knew where Starscream disappeared to in the film, so it was an odd choice for a title even if the Autobots were searching for him.

Regarding canonicity, Chris Ryall wrote, "Doing sequels to movies that nevertheless don't affect any coming sequel have a long tradition in comics [...] and we've been having a lot of fun with this one." Hasbro advised Mowry on the story, leading to four script drafts. They rejected his idea to make the series introduce characters for the next film (which Alex Milne designed), making it into a wrap-up to the first film. However, when discussing the official prequel to the sequel film, it was mentioned that Transformers: Destiny would reference The Reign of Starscream. Ultimately, the 2018 prequel film Bumblebee, which is set around 1980, declared the prequel to be non-canon, as it features a different version of Cliffjumper, who is killed during the film, while the comic featured Cliffjuper among the Autobots that attack Starscream.

The first issue's "B" cover is modeled after Marvel Comics's The Transformers (USA) #5, where Shockwave stands against "Are All Dead" graffiti.

Transformers: Saga of the Allspark
Saga of the Allspark is a 4-issue series reprinting comics from Titan Magazines' Transformers Comic UK. It serves as a prequel to the events of the 2007 Transformers movie, with the exception of the fourth issue which is set just after the movie.

Revenge of the Fallen series

Transformers: Destiny
Destiny is a series that serves as both a sequel to The Reign of Starscream and as a lead in to Revenge of the Fallen, and as such is in direct continuity with the films. Destiny consists of two 4-issue story arcs: the first arc, Transformers: Alliance, began in December 2008, while the concurrent arc, Transformers: Defiance, debuted the following month.

Transformers: Alliance
Alliance is a 4-part comic series that ran from December 2008 to March 2009. It serves as both a sequel to The Reign Of Starscream and as a lead in to Revenge of the Fallen.

Transformers: Defiance
Defiance is a 4-part comic series that ran from January to April 2009. Along with Alliance, it serves as both a sequel to The Reign Of Starscream and (as it is set far in Cybertron's past) provides a backstory for Revenge of the Fallen.

Transformers: Revenge of the Fallen Movie Adaptation
Revenge of the Fallen Movie Adaptation is a 4-part series and an adaptation of the second movie, Revenge of the Fallen.

Transformers: Tales of the Fallen
Tales of the Fallen is a 6-part comic series that ran from August 2009 to January 2010. It takes the form of six spotlights, with each issue focusing on a different Revenge of the Fallen character. The six Transformers whose stories are seen are: Bumblebee, Sideswipe, Jetfire, The Fallen, Arcee and Ravage. The events in these stories occur before or after Revenge of the Fallen.

Transformers: Nefarious
Nefarious is a 6-part comic series that ran from March 2010 to August 2010. The story picks up from the end of Revenge of the Fallen and introduces an all-new adversary for the Transformers (both Autobot and Decepticon). Seeds for the new series were shown in the fifth Tales of the Fallen issue, featuring Ravage, and he along with Soundwave play key roles in the unfolding drama.

Dark of the Moon series

Transformers: Sector 7
Sector 7 is a 5-part comic series that ran from September 2010 to January 2011. The story tells more about the organization Sector 7 and is the first prequel to Transformers: Dark of the Moon.

Transformers: Foundation
Foundation is a 4-part series that acts as the second prequel to Transformers: Dark of the Moon.

Transformers: Rising Storm
Rising Storm is a 4-part series that acts as the third prequel to Transformers: Dark of the Moon.

Transformers: Dark of the Moon Movie Adaptation
Transformers: Dark of the Moon Movie Adaptation is a 4-part series and an adaptation of the third movie, Transformers: Dark of the Moon.

Short stories

Convergence
A 4-chapter prequel for the third film, included as an extra in Dark of the Moon Movie Adaptation.

Transformers
A 6-chapter prequel for the third film, included as an extra with some Target Corporation exclusive toys for Transformers: Dark of the Moon.

Chronological order 
 Transformers: Tales of the Fallen issue 4
 Transformers: Tales of the Fallen issue 3
 Transformers: Foundation
 Transformers: Defiance
 Transformers: Convergence chapter 1
 Transformers: Sector Seven
 Transformers: Convergence chapter 2
 Transformers: Convergence chapter 3
 Transformers: Movie Prequel – Planetfall
 Transformers: Movie Prequel
 Transformers: Movie Adaptation
 Events following two comics fully intersects with the events of Transformers: Movie Adaptation
 Transformers: Movie Prequel – Interlude
 Transformers: Jazz
 Transformers: The Reign of Starscream
 Transformers: Convergence chapter 4
 Transformers: Tales of the Fallen issue 6
 Transformers: Alliance
 Transformers: Tales of the Fallen issue 1
 Transformers: Tales of the Fallen issue 2
 Transformers: Revenge of the Fallen Movie Adaptation
 Transformers: Revenge of the Fallen: Unite for the Universe
 Transformers: Tales of the Fallen issue 5
 Transformers: Nefarious
 Transformers: Space Case
 Events following four comics fully intersects with the events of Transformers: Space Case
 Transformers: Bumblebee
 Transformers: Ratchet
 Transformers: Arcee
 Transformers: Starscream
 Transformers: Rising Storm
 Transformers: Dark of the Moon Movie Adaptation

References

External links
 Sector 7 official promotional website

Film Comic Series
Comics
2007 comics debuts
2011 comics endings
Prequel comics
Sequel comics
Comics based on films